The Kalam Institute of Technology, Berhampur, Ganjam, Odisha, Indian campus is located on the outskirts of Berhampur city on NH-5. It is about 10 km from Berhampur Railway Station & 5 km from Berhampur University. 

The institute is affiliated with Biju Patnaik University of Technology (BPUT) and approved by All India Council for Technical Education (AICTE).

References

Engineering colleges in Odisha
All India Council for Technical Education
Colleges affiliated with Biju Patnaik University of Technology
Education in Berhampur
Educational institutions established in 2008
2008 establishments in Orissa